Quy  may refer to:

People
Andy Quy (born 1976), English footballer and coach
Tim Quy (1961–2023), English percussionist
Nguyễn Văn Quỳ (1925–2022), Vietnamese composer and musician
Võ Quý (1929–2017), Vietnamese zoologist, ornithologist and professor

Places
Phú Quý, a small island located about 100 km from Phan Thiết city, Vietnam
QUY, IATA code for a Royal Air Force base in Cambridgeshire, England
Stow cum Quy, a parish in Cambridgeshire, England